Grégory Poirier (born 9 July 1982) is a French professional football manager and former player who is the manager of  club Martigues. As a player, he was a midfielder.

References

External links
 

1982 births
Living people
French footballers
Ligue 2 players
Championnat National players
AC Arlésien players
Nîmes Olympique players
Amiens SC players
Association football midfielders
French football managers